Bani al-Ward is a sub-district located in Mudhaykhirah District, Ibb Governorate, Yemen. Bani al-Ward had a population of 1,539 according to the 2004 census.

References 

Sub-districts in Mudhaykhirah District